Vyšné Opátske is a borough (city ward) of Košice, Slovakia. Vyšné Opátske has a mostly rural character, with a population of nearly 2,500 inhabitants.

History 
The village of Vyšné Opátske first appeared in written records in 1344.

In the 20th century, Vyšné Opátske lost village municipality status and was annexed to Košice as one of its boroughs.

Statistics

 Area: 
 Population: 2,480 (31 December 2017) 
 Density of population: 590/km2 (31 December 2017) 
 District: Košice IV
 Mayor: Viktor Mikluš (as of 2018 elections)

References

External links

 Official website of the Vyšné Opátske borough
 Article on the Vyšné Opátske borough at Cassovia.sk
 Official website of Košice

Boroughs of Košice
Villages in Slovakia merged with towns